Liu Xiao (Last name: Liu, Given name: Xiao, Simplified Chinese: 刘晓, Traditional Chinese: 劉曉) is a female Chinese track and field athlete who competes in the long jump. She represented China at the international 2007 Summer Universiade, 2009 Summer Universiade (final 8th place), and 2011 Summer Universiade. She also represented Peking University for 2011 Nike FUSC Chinese College Students Track and Field Elite Tournament
 and 2011 Beijing College Students Track and Field Games. She was 3rd place of Women's long jump of Chinese Athletics Championships, 2011. Part of her performance can be found at IAAF.

She graduated from Peking University with Bachelor and Master degrees in Sociology in 2009 and 2013, respectively.

References

External links
 Liu, Xiao profile at IAAF International Association of Athletics Federations

Year of birth missing (living people)
Living people
Athletes from Shandong
Chinese female long jumpers
Competitors at the 2007 Summer Universiade
Competitors at the 2009 Summer Universiade
Competitors at the 2011 Summer Universiade
21st-century Chinese women